Thaayum Magalum is a 1965 Indian Tamil-language historical drama film directed by M. A. Thirumugam and produced by Sandow M. M. A. Chinnappa Thevar. The film stars S. A. Ashokan, Adhithan and K. R. Vijaya. It was released on 28 May 1965.

Plot

Cast 
The list is adapted from Thiraikalanjiyam Part2.

Male cast
S. A. Ashokan as Vijay
Adhithan
S. V. Subbaiah as Subramaniyam
V. K. Ramasamy
Thaai Nagesh
T. R. Natarajan
Sandow M. M. A. Chinnappa Thevar
S. V. Ramadas
Master Ramachandran

Female cast
K. R. Vijaya as Sumathi
B. Saroja Devi as Saraswathi
Manorama
S. Rajamani
Baby Kausalya
Mala

Production 
Sandow M. M. A. Chinnappa Thevar usually produced films under the banner Devar Films starring M. G. Ramachandran with music composed by K. V. Mahadevan. He launched Dhandayuthapani Films to produce films with a different cast and crew. This is one such film. Dialogues were written by Thiyaagan while supervised by Kannadasan.

Soundtrack 
Music was composed by P. S. Diwakar and the lyrics were penned by Kannadasan.

Reception 
Kalki said Vijaya gave life to the film.

References

External links 
 

1960s historical drama films
1960s Tamil-language films
Films directed by M. A. Thirumugam
Indian historical drama films